Talita Antunes da Rocha (born August 29, 1982) is a Brazilian beach volleyball player, playing as a blocker. She was FIVB rookie of the year in 2005, and World Tour Winner twice, in 2013 and 2015.

Career
Born in Aquidauana, Antunes caught the attention of Olympic Champion Jackie Silva at the age of 19. From the first time they played together, in Maceió in 2001, Jackie was impressed with Antunes' style and invited the young player to partner with her in 2002. The pair won the South American Championship in La Paz, Bolívia 2002.

After Silva was injured, Talita continued the 2002 season with Renata Ribeiro as her new partner. They won the championships in the Challenger Banco do Brasil in Natal and they were runners-up in the games held in Rio and Recife. In 2003, she was again champion in Goiânia do Circuito Banco do Brasil, this time with a new partner, Tais Jesus. She also partnered with Giseli Gavio on the Italian Circuit, ranking fourth overall. In 2005, she resumed her partnership with Ribeiro and was voted FIVB World Tour rookie of the year. Their partnership won them several competitions and they became one of the top-ranking teams in the world tour. In 2008, Talita was crowned Queen of the Beach in Brazil. In that same year, Talita and Renata represented Brazil in the 2008 Beijing Olympics. They finished fourth after losing a hard-fought Bronze Medal Match to the Chinese Team.

In 2009, Talita forged a new partnership with Maria Elisa Antonelli. They won gold in the 2009 Swatch FIVB World Tour in China, South Korea, Switzerland, and Norway.  They also won the bronze medal at the 2009 World Championships in Stavanger, Norway. Their strong partnership landed Talita and Maria 1st overall ranking in the 2009 Brazilian Beach Volleyball Circuit and 2nd overall ranking in the 2009 World Ranking. Talita and Maria Elisa went to the 2012 Summer Olympics in London, but were upset in the round of 16 by a Czech double.

After the Olympics, Talita partnered with Taiana Lima and won the FIVB Beach Volleyball World Tour for the first time in 2013. The following year, Larissa França, a former world champion who  won bronze in London, signed to form a partnership with  Talita aiming the 2016 Summer Olympics Brazil would host in Rio de Janeiro. Larissa and Talita were World Tour champions and Team of the Year in 2015, and were deemed favorites for the Olympic gold. Talita got to her second Olympic semifinal after a hard-fought win over the Swiss team of Joana Heidrich and Nadine Zumkehr in the quarterfinals, but went on to lose 2–0 to the Germans Ludwig and Walkenhosrt in the semi final. April Ross and Kerri Walsh Jennings (the latter of whom also beat Talita in the 2008 semifinal) then won the bronze medal over the team in 3 sets.

Personal life
Talita is married to Renato França, who coaches male beach volleyball squad Pedro Solberg and Evandro Oliveira.

References

External links

 
 
 
 
 
 

1982 births
Living people
Brazilian women's beach volleyball players
Beach volleyball blockers
Beach volleyball players at the 2008 Summer Olympics
Beach volleyball players at the 2012 Summer Olympics
Olympic beach volleyball players of Brazil
Beach volleyball players at the 2016 Summer Olympics
Sportspeople from Mato Grosso do Sul
21st-century Brazilian women